Leninsky City District is an administrative district (raion), one of the 10 raions of Novosibirsk, Russia. It is located on the left bank of the Ob River. Population: 302,803 (2018 Census). It is the most populous district of the city.

History
The district was established on December 9, 1970.

Streets

Microdistricts
 Bashnya Microdistrict
 Gorsky Microdistrict
 Sad Kirova
 Stanislavsky Zhilmassiv
 Trolleyny Zhilmassiv
 Yugo-Zapadny Zhimassiv
 Yuzhny Microdistrict
 Zapadny Microdistrict

Architecture

Soviet architecture

Post-Soviet architecture

Education
 Novosibirsk State Technical University is a big research and educational center. It was established in 1950.
 Siberian State University of Geosystems and Technologies is an educational center established in 1933.
 Siberian University of Consumer Cooperation is a university founded in 1956.

Memorials

Monument of Glory

Parks
 Gagarin Square
 Kirov Park
 Square of Glory

Culture

Media

Food
The Pyshechnaya is a cafe on Stanislvsky Street. It was opened in the mid-twentieth century. Soviet interior has been preserved in the cafe (mosaic walls, chandeliers and front sign).

Sports
 Junior Children's Football School
 Sibselmash is a bandy club founded in 1937, subsequently reestablished in 1974.
 Novosibirsk Hippodrome
 Ob Sports Complex
 Penguin Curling Club is a curling center, opened in 2015.
 Zarya Sports Training Center

Economy

Companies
 2GIS is a technology company that develops digital guides and maps of cities in Russia, Kazakhstan, Italy, Czech Republic, Chile, UAE, Kyrgyzstan, Cyprus and Ukraine.
 Novosibirsk Cartridge Plant is a plant that produces battle, hunting, service, sports and traumatic cartridges.
 Novosibirsk Plant of Metal Structures
 NPM Group is a producer of equipment for fast foam-free dispensing of foamy beverages (beer and others) and milk vending machines.
 Sibselmash Company

Thermal power plants
 Novosibirsk Thermal Power Plant 2
 Novosibirsk Thermal Power Plant 3

Transportation

Railway
Five railway stations are located in the district: Levaya Ob, Zhilmasiv, Novosibirsk-Zapadny, Ippodrom and Kleshchikha.

Metro
Two Novosibirsk Metro stations are located in the district: Ploshchad Marksa and Studencheskaya.

References